"Louder than Words" is a song recorded by French disc jockey, David Guetta and Dutch music producer and DJ Afrojack featuring vocals from Niles Mason. It was released digitally on 2 July 2010 worldwide. It charted at number 35 in Austria and received more than 6 million views on YouTube.

Track listing

Chart performance

Release history

References

2010 singles
David Guetta songs
Songs written by David Guetta
Afrojack songs
Songs written by Afrojack
2010 songs
Song recordings produced by David Guetta